Sergey Vitalyevich Bezrukov (born 18 October 1973) is a Soviet and Russian film and stage actor, singer, People's Artist of Russia, the laureate of the State Prize of the Russian Federation. He currently works at Tabakov Studio (the theatre of Oleg Tabakov). He is a member of the Supreme Council of the party United Russia.

Biography

Early life and education
Sergei Bezrukov was born on 18 October 1973 in Moscow. His father was Vitali Bezrukov, an actor and director who worked at the Moscow Satire Theatre. Sergei's mother was Natalia Bezrukova (née Surova), she graduated from the Gorky College of Soviet Trade and worked as a shop manager. Sergei Bezrukov was named in honor of his father's favorite poet, Sergei Yesenin.

After graduating from secondary school No. 402 in the Perovsk district of Moscow in 1990, he entered the Moscow Art Theater School. In 1994 he graduated from the acting department of the Moscow Art Theater School, with the specialization being Actor of Drama Theater and Cinema (Oleg Tabakov's workshop), and was immediately accepted into the troupe of the Moscow Theater Studio under Oleg Tabakov.

Career
Sergei Bezrukov made his cinematic debut in Nocturne for Drum and Motorcycle.

From 1995 until 2000, he worked on the satirical program Puppets which aired on the NTV channel. Puppets were used on the show to represent famous people, mainly politicians. He voiced twelve characters on the show, among them such famous personalities as Boris Yeltsin and Vladimir Zhirinovsky. Bezrukov gained more exposure as an actor with the show.

In 2002 Bezrukov gained his big break; he got the role of gang leader Sasha Belov in the popular crime TV show Brigada. After the series aired Sergei Bezrukov became a household name in Russia. In the same year Bezrukov played Ivan Brilling in the historical detective miniseries Azazel, based on The Winter Queen by Boris Akunin.

Other roles followed, such as Irakliy in The Irony of Fate 2, Kappel in Admiral, Sumarokov in High Security Vacation, and Rzhevskiy in The Ballad of Uhlans.

In 2005 Bezrukov fulfilled his childhood dream, when he portrayed the poet Sergei Yesenin, after whom he was named, in the 2005 miniseries Yesenin. It was based on the novel Yesenin. Story of a Murder written by his father, Vitaly, who also portrayed Yesenin in a 1969 film, titled Anna Snegina.

Another notable role was Yeshua Ha-Nozri in the 2005 series The Master and Margarita.

He voiced the title character of Prince Vladimir animated film. He is also known for his theatre role of Chichikov in Dead Souls (which won the Moskovskij Komsomolets''' award). In 2006, he portrayed Alexander Pushkin, revered as the Russian language's greatest poet, in Pushkin: The Last Duel.

Sergei portrayed the popular Soviet singer Vladimir Vysotsky in the 2011 film Vysotsky. Thank You For Being Alive. CGI and heavy makeup was used to make the actor look like Vysotsky. Bezrukov was not credited for his role and it was only later revealed that he was the actor.

In 2017, Sergei acted in the film After You're Gone, directed by his wife Anna Matison. The comedy-drama told the story of a ballet dancer who suffered a spinal injury and decides to stage an original ballet performance.

According to the survey of ROMIR Monitoring, in Russia he was called the favorite actor of 2005.

In March 2014 he signed a letter in support of the position of the President of Russia Vladimir Putin on Russia's military intervention in Ukraine.

In 2020, he advocated 2020 amendments to the Constitution of Russia, which, in particular, are defining marriage as a relationship between one man and one woman. He explained his position by saying, that the terms 'parent 1 and parent 2' shouldn't be allowed to exist in Russia. "I propagate love between a man and a woman, and prefer not to have a deal with gender equality", he also said.

In 2022 Bezrukov publicly supported the 2022 Russian invasion of Ukraine. 

 Sanctions 
In July 2022 the EU imposed sanctions on Sergey Bezrukov in relation to the 2022 Russian invasion of Ukraine.

Personal life
From 2000 to 2015 he was married to actress Irina Bezrukova (to marry Bezrukov she broke up with actor Igor Livanov, they became officially married when Sergei was acting in the TV series Brigada''). In 2015 the couple separated.

Sergei Bezrukov married director and screenwriter Anna Matison on 11 March 2016. On 4 July 2016 they had a daughter, Maria.

At the end of 2013, the media, citing Bezrukov's father, reported that Sergei has young children: daughter Alexandra and son Ivan; their mother was identified as a St. Petersburg actress by the name of Kristina Smirnova (born 1983 in Latvia).

Selected filmography

References

External links
 

 Sergey Bezrukov at Instagram
 Sergey Bezrukov at Twitter
 Sergey Bezrukov at Facebook
 Sergey Bezrukov in a role of poet Sergey Yesenin

1973 births
20th-century Russian male actors
21st-century Russian male actors
Living people
Male actors from Moscow
Academicians of the National Academy of Motion Picture Arts and Sciences of Russia
Moscow Art Theatre School alumni
Honored Artists of the Russian Federation
People's Artists of Russia
State Prize of the Russian Federation laureates
Russian male film actors
Russian male stage actors
Russian male television actors
Russian male voice actors
United Russia politicians
Anti-Ukrainian sentiment in Russia
Russian individuals subject to European Union sanctions